Judge Wood may refer to:

Andrea Wood (born 1973), judge of the United States District Court for the Northern District of Illinois
Diane Wood (born 1950), judge of the United States Court of Appeals for the Seventh Circuit
Harlington Wood Jr. (1920–2008), judge of the United States Court of Appeals for the Seventh Circuit
Harold Kenneth Wood (1906–1972), judge of the United States District Court for the Eastern District of Pennsylvania
Harry E. Wood (1926–2009), judge of the United States Court of Claims and of the United States Court of Federal Claims
John H. Wood Jr. (1916–1979), judge of the United States District Court for the Western District of Texas
Kimba Wood (born 1944), judge of the United States District Court for the Southern District of New York
Lisa Godbey Wood (born 1963), judge of the United States District Court for the Southern District of Georgia

See also
Judge Woods (disambiguation)
Justice Wood (disambiguation)